The Cloud of Unknowing is a 14th-century guidebook by an anonymous English monk. It  may also refer to:

Books
 Rashh-i-'Amá ("Sprinkling of the Cloud of Unknowing"), first known text of Bahá’u’lláh, founder of the Bahá'í Faith
 The title of one of the sections in Underworld (DeLillo novel) (1997)

Films
The Cloud of Unknowing, a 2002 film by Richard Sylvarnes with Miho Nikaido and Thomas Jay Ryan

Music
"Cloud of Unknowing", choral song cycle by Robert Kyr
The Cloud of Unknowing (album), a 2007 album by James Blackshaw
"The Cloud of Unknowing", song by Current 93 on their 1994 album Of Ruine or Some Blazing Starre
"The Cloud of Unknowing", song by The Claudia Quintet on their 2004 album I, Claudia
"Cloud of Unknowing", song by Gorillaz on their 2010 album Plastic Beach
"Cloud of Unknowing", song by Swans on their 2016 album The Glowing Man